Messier 91 (also known as NGC 4548 or M91) is a barred spiral galaxy that is found in the south of Coma Berenices. It is in the local supercluster and is part of the Virgo Cluster of galaxies. It is about 63 million light-years away from our galaxy. It was the last of a group of eight "nebulae" – the term 'galaxy' only coming into use for these objects once it was realized in the 20th century that they were extragalactic – discovered by Charles Messier in 1781. It is the faintest object in the Messier catalog, with an apparent magnitude of 10.2.

As a result of a bookkeeping error by Messier, M91 was for a long time one of the few missing entries in the Messier catalog, not matching any known object in the sky. It was not until 1969 that amateur astronomer William C. Williams realized that M91 was NGC 4548, which was catalogued by William Herschel in 1784. Some sources contend the nearby spiral galaxy NGC 4571 was considered as a candidate for this object by Herschel.

Observation history
The object was discovered in 1781 by Messier who described it as nebula without stars, fainter than M90. Messier mistakenly logged its position from Messier 58, where in fact it should have been Messier 89. William Herschel observed the same object in 1784.

In 1969 Williams solved this lost Messier object by measuring its right ascension and declination relative to those of the nearby galaxy M89 (notable reference stars angularly nearby are sparse) – rather than M58, a 9th-magnitude galaxy which Messier recorded in 1778. This amended night sky "star-hopping" reference point matches Messier's figures to 0.1 of an arcminute in right ascension and 1 in declination, a sixtieth of a degree.

Features
Inclusion of Messier 91 in the Virgo cluster was confirmed in 1997 from observing Cepheid variables which place it at 52 ±6 million light years away.

Its bar is very conspicuous – it is seen with position angle of 65 to 245 degrees when being measured from the North direction to the East.

There is a countering peculiar (local) velocity toward us through the Virgo cluster of about 700 km/s within the cluster's recession velocity of about 1100 km/s, which produces its observed recessional velocity of only about 400 km/s. Another source gives the latter figure as 803 km/s.

Messier 91 is also classified as an anemic galaxy, that is: a spiral galaxy with little star formation and gas compared with other galaxies of its type.

See also
 List of Messier objects

References and footnotes

External links

 SEDS: Messier Object 91
 Galaxy M91

Barred spiral galaxies
Virgo Cluster
Coma Berenices
091
NGC objects
07753
41934
Astronomical objects discovered in 1781
Discoveries by Charles Messier